Marfino is a rural locality (a selo) and the administrative center of Marfinsky Selsoviet of Volodarsky District, Astrakhan Oblast, Russia. The population was 3,268 as of 2010. There are 62 streets.

Geography 
Marfino is located 16 km east of Volodarsky (the district's administrative centre) by road. Kudrino is the nearest rural locality.

References 

Rural localities in Volodarsky District, Astrakhan Oblast